Woodside Township may refer to the following townships in the United States:

 Woodside Township, Sangamon County, Illinois
 Woodside Township, Otter Tail County, Minnesota
 Woodside Township, Polk County, Minnesota
 Woodside Township, New Jersey